The 1970 Georgia Bulldogs football team represented the Georgia Bulldogs of the University of Georgia during the 1970 NCAA University Division football season.

Schedule

Source: 1971 Georgia Bulldogs Football Media Guide/Yearbook

Roster

Game summaries

Auburn

References

Georgia
Georgia Bulldogs football seasons
Georgia Bulldogs football